Qiyaslı (also, Kiyasly) is a village in the Agdam Rayon of Azerbaijan.

Religion 
Giyasly village Mosque

References 

Populated places in Aghdam District